Two warships of Japan have borne the name  :

 , a  launched in 1915 and struck in 1932
 , a  launched in 1945 but never completed

Imperial Japanese Navy ship names
Japanese Navy ship names